Miluše Bittnerová (born 10 December 1977 in Jičín) is a Czech actress and presenter.

Selected filmography

Films 
 Nejlepší přítel (2017) TV
 Hodina klavíru (2017) TV
 Tajemství pouze služební (2016)
 Andílek na nervy (2015)
 Bankrotáři (2003) TV

TV series 
 Kameňák (2019)
 Jetelín (2016)
 Ohnivý kuře (2016)
 Ordinace v růžové zahradě (2009)
 Ulice (2005)

References

External links
 
 Biography on csfd.cz

1977 births
Living people
Czech film actresses
21st-century Czech actresses
Czech stage actresses
Czech television actresses
20th-century Czech actresses
People from Jičín
Academy of Performing Arts in Prague alumni
Czech voice actresses